John Charles Gittins (born 1938) is a researcher in applied probability and operations research, who is a professor and Emeritus Fellow at Keble College, Oxford University.

He is renowned as the developer of the "Gittins index", which is used for sequential decision-making, especially in research and development in the pharmaceutical industry. He has research interests in applied probability, decision analysis and optimal decisions, including optimal stopping and stochastic optimization.

Gittins was an Assistant Director of Research at the Department of Engineering, Cambridge University from 1967 to 1974. Then he was a lecturer at Oxford University from 1975 to 2005 and head of the Department of Statistics there for 6 years. In 1992, Oxford University awarded him the degree Doctor of Science (D. Sci.). In 1996 he became a Professor of Statistics  at Oxford University.

He has been awarded the Rollo Davidson Prize (1982) for early-career probabilists, and the Guy Medal in Silver (1984).

Selected publications
(1989) Multi-Armed Bandit Allocation Indices, Wiley. 
(1985) (with Bergman, S.W.) Statistical Methods for Pharmaceutical Research Planning, CRC Press. 
(2000) (with H. Pezeshk) "How Large Should a Clinical Trial Be?", The Statistician, 49 (2), 177–187 )
(2001) (with G. Harper) "Bounds on the Performance of a Greedy Algorithm for Probabilities". Mathematics of Operations Research, 26, 313–323
(2003) "Stochastic Models for the Planning of Pharmaceutical Research", Journal of Statistical Theory and Applications, 2 (2), 198–214.
(2011) (with K. D. Glazebrook and R. R. Weber) Multi-Armed Bandit Allocation Indices, second edition, Wiley,

References

External links
Home page for John Gittins

1938 births
British statisticians
Probability theorists
British operations researchers
Fellows of Keble College, Oxford
Living people
Alumni of the University of Wales
Academics of the University of Cambridge
Academics of the University of Oxford